Cieszów may refer to the following places in Poland:
Cieszów, Lower Silesian Voivodeship (south-west Poland)
Cieszów, Lubusz Voivodeship (west Poland)